Abdul Rauff Hibbathul Hakeem (born 13 April 1960) is a Sri Lankan politician and current member of parliament, representing the Kandy electorate since 2010. Hakeem is the leader of the Sri Lanka Muslim Congress (SLMC), and a member of the United National Front for Good Governance.

Early life and education
Hakeem was born 13 April 1960 in Nawalapitiya in the Kandy District. He was educated at Royal College, Colombo and attended the Sri Lanka Law College, taking oaths as an attorney-at-law. He later gained a LL.M. degree from the University of Colombo.

Political career
Hakeem met M. H. M. Ashraff, founder and leader of the Sri Lanka Muslim Congress (SLMC), whilst working at Faisz Musthapha's chambers.

Sri Lanka Muslim Congress 
Hakeem joined the SLMC in 1988. He served as general-secretary of the party from 1992 to 2000 and represented it at the All Party Conference between 1991 and 1993. Prior to the 1994 parliamentary election the SLMC entered into an electoral pact with main opposition People's Alliance (PA).

Parliament 
After the election Hakeem was appointed as a PA National List MP in the Sri Lankan Parliament. Following the PA's victory the SLMC joined the new government. Ashraff was appointed Minister of Shipping, Ports and Rehabilitation and two other SLMC MPs became deputy ministers whilst Hakeem became Deputy Chairman of Committees.

By 2000 relations between the SLMC and PA had become strained. Earlier, in 1999, Ashraff had founded the National Unity Alliance (NUA) with the aim of creating a "united Sri Lanka by 2012". Ashraff was killed in a mysterious helicopter crash on 16 September 2000. Hakeem contested the 2000 parliamentary election as one of the NUA's candidates in Kandy District. He was elected and re-entered Parliament. He was appointed Minister of Internal and International Trade Commerce, Muslim Religious Affairs and Shipping Development after the election.

Leader of the SLMC 
Following the death of Ashraff in September 2000 Hakeem became the SLMC's "thesiya thalaivar" (national leader) but there was a power struggle between Ashraff's widow Ferial Ashraff and Hakeem for control of the party. In June 2001 President Chandrika Kumaratunga dismissed Hakeem from the cabinet. As a result, Hakeem and most SLMC MPs left the PA. However, Ferial Ashraff remained in the PA as leader of the NUA.

United National Front 
In October 2001 the Hakeem led SLMC joined the United National Party dominated United National Front (UNF). Hakeem contested the 2001 parliamentary election as one of the UNF's candidates in Kandy District. He was elected and re-entered Parliament. The UNF defeated the PA at the election after which Hakeem was appointed Minister of Ports Development and Shipping in the UNF government.

Hakeem contested the 2004 parliamentary election as one of the SLMC's candidates in Ampara District. He was elected and re-entered Parliament. He however lost his cabinet position after the UNF was defeated by the newly formed United People's Freedom Alliance (UPFA).

United People's Freedom Alliance 
In January 2007 the SLMC joined the UPFA. Hakeem was rewarded by being appointed Minister of Posts and Telecommunication. The SLMC left the UPFA in December 2007. Hakeem resigned from Parliament in April 2008 to contest the provincial council election. He contested the 2008 provincial council election as one of the UNF's candidates in Trincomalee District and was elected to the Eastern Provincial Council (EPC). After the UNF failed to win control of the EPC Hakeem resigned in July 2008 and was appointed as UNF National List MP.

United National Front 
Hakeem contested the 2010 parliamentary election as one of the UNF's candidates in Kandy District. He was elected and re-entered Parliament.

United People's Freedom Alliance 
In November 2010 the SLMC joined UPFA again. Hakeem was rewarded by being appointed Minister of Justice.

2015 presidential election 
The SLMC left the UPFA in December 2014 to support common opposition candidate Maithripala Sirisena at the presidential election. President Mahinda Rajapaksa dismissed Hakeem from the cabinet. After the election newly elected President Sirisena rewarded Hakeem by appointing him Minister of Urban Development, Water Supply and Drainage.

United National Front for Good Governance 
In July 2015 the SLMC joined with other anti-Rajapaksa parties to form the United National Front for Good Governance (UNFGG) to contest the parliamentary election. Hakeem was one of the UNFGG's candidates in Kandy District at the 2015 parliamentary election. He was elected and re-entered Parliament. His cabinet portfolio was changed to Minister of City Planning and Water Supply after the election.

Kumari Cooray controversy
During the 2001 parliamentary election campaign Kumari Cooray, daughter of politician Mervyn J. Cooray, claimed and then denied that she had been having an affair with Hakeem. In May 2004, during the struggle to fill the Speaker position in Parliament, Cooray appeared on Rupavahini and claimed that Hakeem had ended their relationship and that she was suicidal. Cooray killed herself by setting herself ablaze outside Hakeem's home in Kollupitiya on 6 October 2005. According to the Sunday Times, two months prior to her suicide Cooray had made a complaint at Kollupitiya police station that Hakeem had assaulted her at her home.

Personal life
Hakeem is married to Shanaz (Shahnaz), owner of an ice cream parlour in Colombo.

Electoral history

References

External links

 rauffhakeem.lk

1960 births
Alumni of Royal College, Colombo
Alumni of Sri Lanka Law College
Deputy chairmen of committees of the Parliament of Sri Lanka
Justice ministers of Sri Lanka
Living people
Members of the 10th Parliament of Sri Lanka
Members of the 11th Parliament of Sri Lanka
Members of the 12th Parliament of Sri Lanka
Members of the 13th Parliament of Sri Lanka
Members of the 14th Parliament of Sri Lanka
Members of the 15th Parliament of Sri Lanka
Members of the 16th Parliament of Sri Lanka
Members of the Eastern Provincial Council
National Unity Alliance politicians
People from Central Province, Sri Lanka
Posts ministers of Sri Lanka
Shipping ministers of Sri Lanka
Sri Lanka Muslim Congress politicians
Sri Lankan Moor lawyers
Sri Lankan Moor politicians
Sri Lankan Muslims
Telecommunication ministers of Sri Lanka
United People's Freedom Alliance politicians
Urban development ministers of Sri Lanka
Samagi Jana Balawegaya politicians